Lophoceps is a genus of moths in the family Sesiidae.

Species
Lophoceps abdominalis  Hampson, 1919
Lophoceps alenicola (Strand, [1913])
Lophoceps quinquepuncta  Hampson, 1919
Lophoceps cyaniris  Hampson, 1919
Lophoceps tetrazona  Hampson, 1919

References

Sesiidae